Major General Walter Harvey Yates Jr. (born November 6, 1941) is a retired United States Army officer who served as Deputy Commanding General of the Fifth United States Army.  He is a native of Hattiesburg, Mississippi and 1963 graduate of The University of Southern Mississippi with a Bachelor of Science degree in Mathematics.  He also holds a Master of Science degree in Foreign Affairs from George Washington University.  In addition, General Yates attended the DOD Joint Warfighting course and the Harvard program for National and International Securities Studies.

During his career, Yates held a variety of important command and staff positions to include Deputy Commanding General V (US) Corps, United States Army Europe from September 26, 1994 to September 24, 1996; Assistant Division Commander (Maneuver), 3rd Armored Division; Commander of the Giessen Military Community, United States Army Europe; Commander U.S. Army Berlin and the Berlin Brigade, United States Army Europe; and Deputy Director National Military Command Center J-3 and Chief of Conventional Plans Division J-7, the Joint Staff, Washington, D.C.  A graduate of the Army Aviation School, he also served as commanding officer of the 503rd Aviation Battalion (Combat), the Apache Training Brigade and the 6th Cavalry Brigade.  Yates retired from active duty on January 31, 1998.

His military decorations include the Distinguished Service Medal, Defense Superior Service Medal, Legion of Merit with Oak Leaf Cluster, Distinguished Flying Cross, Bronze Star, Purple Heart, Meritorious Service Medal with Oak Leaf Cluster, twenty-three Air Medals and the Army Commendation Medal.

  Army Distinguished Service Medal
  Defense Superior Service Medal
  Legion of Merit with oak leaf cluster
  Distinguished Flying Cross
  Bronze Star
  Purple Heart
  Meritorious Service Medal with oak leaf cluster
  Air Medal with numeral "23"
  Army Commendation Medal

Personal
Yates is the son of Walter Harvey Yates Sr. (December 15, 1913 – September 24, 1996) and Mary Marie (Mordica) Yates (February 25, 1918 – July 6, 2014).

Notes

References

 

1941 births
Living people
People from Hattiesburg, Mississippi
University of Southern Mississippi alumni
American Master Army Aviators
United States Army personnel of the Vietnam War
Recipients of the Air Medal
Recipients of the Distinguished Flying Cross (United States)
Elliott School of International Affairs alumni
Recipients of the Meritorious Service Medal (United States)
Harvard University alumni
Recipients of the Legion of Merit
United States Army generals
Recipients of the Defense Superior Service Medal
Recipients of the Distinguished Service Medal (US Army)
Recipients of the Order of Merit of Berlin